"Plug Tunin'" (includes the subtitle "Are You Ready for This?") is a song by hip hop trio De La Soul. In June 1988 it was released as the group's debut single as part of a double A-side with "Freedom of Speak (We Got Three Minutes)". A remix of the song, under the title "Plug Tunin' (Last Chance to Comprehend)", would later be included on their debut album 3 Feet High and Rising.

Lyrically, the song is idiosyncratic, however, musically it laid the foundations for the sound the group would realise more fully with their debut album.

In the end of year-roundups, the song placed at  40 in the magazine The Face list of best singles of 1988. In January 1998 was included on The Sources "The 100 Best Rap Singles of All Time" list. In 1999, Ego Trips editors ranked "Plug Tunin'" at  8 in their list of Hip Hop's 40 Greatest Singles by Year 1988 in Ego Trip's Book of Rap Lists. In 2013 was ranked by Complex at  5 on their list "The 100 Best Native Tongues Songs".

Plug Tunin' has also been sampled by other artists such as Nas, Common and the Gravediggaz.

Conception and composition 
Lyrically, the song is idiosyncratic; "Transistors are never more shown with like / When vocal flow brings it all down in ruin / Due to a clue of a naughty noise called Plug Tunin' (Hmm-mm, hmm-mm, hmm-mm, hmm-mm, hmmmm)", however, musically it laid the foundations for the sound the group would realise more fully with their debut album 3 Feet High and Rising.

The song is sampled on the Gravediggaz' "Defective Trip", which is also produced by Prince Paul.

Track listing
 "Plug Tunin' (Are You Ready for This?)" - 3:41
 "Freedom of Speak (We Got Three Minutes)" - 2:52
 "Freedom of Speak (We Got More Than Three)" - 4:16
 "Plug Tunin' (Something's Wrong Here)" - 3:10
 "Strictly Dan Stuckie" - 0:38

References

1988 singles
De La Soul songs
Songs written by Vincent Mason
Songs written by Kelvin Mercer
Songs written by David Jude Jolicoeur
Songs written by Prince Paul (producer)
Song recordings produced by Prince Paul (producer)
1988 songs
Tommy Boy Records singles